The Haunting in Connecticut 2: Ghosts of Georgia is a 2013 psychological horror film that serves as a spiritual successor to The Haunting in Connecticut by Gold Circle Films. The script was written by David Coggeshall and Tom Elkins served as director. It was released in a limited theatrical run, and through video on demand, on February 1, 2013. The story was inspired by the events surrounding the Wyrick house of Ellerslie, Georgia, which were published in the book The Veil: Heidi Wyrick's Story.

Plot

The film is set in 1993. Andy and Lisa Wyrick, along with their daughter Heidi, move into a rural home after receiving a deal from the bank. They are told that no one had previously lived on the land, which is why they are getting such a great deal. Shortly after moving in, Heidi begins to experience visions. After a visit from Lisa's sister Joyce, it is revealed that Heidi, along with her mother, aunt, and grandmother, was born with a veil over her face, allowing the women of the family to have visions. Joyce embraces her visions, but Lisa tries to prevent them with the help of medication to no avail as she begins to have nightmares and visions of her mother.

One of Heidi's visions is of a man she calls Mr. Gordy, who tells her things to prove his existence, such as money being buried in the garden, and a swing being deep in the woods. When these things turn out to be true, it is revealed that Mr. Gordy had in fact owned the house before the Wyricks. To test Heidi's knowledge, Joyce and Lisa do some research and ask Heidi to pick Mr. Gordy out of a bunch of old photos, which she does. Lisa begins to have visions of a figure coming after her and her daughter and starts to worry about the sanity of herself and that of her daughter, which leads her to tell Heidi not to speak to Mr. Gordy anymore.

One day, the family receives a visit from the local pastor, who tells them that their property was once part of the Underground Railroad and that a stationmaster lived on their land. He tells them of all the good that the stationmaster brought about and warns the family that they may get some visitors wishing to pay homage to the stationmaster, and asks them to be kinder than the previous owner, Mr. Gordy, was.

Andy comes home with a dog for Heidi named Chief, trying to alleviate some of the tension that has built up in their family since moving into the new house, but soon after Chief follows something into the woods. When Andy and Heidi go to look for him, they can hear him crying from the woods and find him trapped in a snare. Andy tells Lisa that the snares would have been perfect for a taxidermist, because they would catch and kill animals without leaving a mark. While destroying the snares to prevent Chief from getting caught again, Andy finds Heidi talking to someone who is not there. When he asks her about it, she says that Mr. Gordy says that some people are coming.

These people turn out to be Mama Kay and her grandson who buy a quilt from Joyce that she had found at the old station. Mama Kay tells Heidi that she is special and to be careful of what she sees, while her grandson tells Andy the true story of the stationmaster. He was primarily a taxidermist and would enlist the help of guides called conductors to help guide slaves to a meeting place. He would hold them somewhere secret, then when it was safe, he would move them to the next location. Two of the slaves he had hidden were Mama Kay's ancestors, Nell and Levi, but they were never heard from again after they stopped at the station. When the townspeople found out about his involvement, they blindfolded him, filled his abdomen with stuffing and hanged him from the tree where the swing once was that Heidi had seen.

Andy relays this information to Joyce and Lisa, who then relays it to Heidi, but tells her that the stationmaster was a good man and helped a lot of people. When Heidi insists that an evil exists in the woods, Lisa becomes frustrated and tells her that she cannot believe her because she cares about her and orders Heidi to get out of the bathtub. When Heidi takes too long, Lisa returns to the bathroom as the lights flicker. The stationmaster is seen standing next to Lisa as Heidi is face down in the bathtub. Lisa pulls her out and attempts to use the Heimlich maneuver to expel the water from her lungs, only for Heidi to cough up sawdust and insects. Concerned, the family takes Heidi to the hospital, where her story is questioned. Heidi seems to have no memory of what happened and tells the doctor that when she didn't get out of the tub like she was supposed to, her mom pulled her out of the tub really hard, making it even harder to believe Lisa's story. As Lisa is leaving, Heidi tells her that it is hard when people don't believe you, indicating that she knew what she was doing.

Later, the family asks the pastor to come out and bless the land and Heidi. During the blessing, Joyce experiences frightening visions of slaves being taken to the station by the stationmaster, along with the conductors, and she sees the bodies of her family members decomposing during the blessing. That night Heidi follows a ghost out of her house, who turns out to be Nell. She leads her out into the woods, where she disappears. Meanwhile, Lisa is having nightmares and awakens to find out that Heidi is missing, and Andy runs out into the woods to look for her.

Somehow, Heidi falls to the bottom of the station and begs her father not to leave her down there with "them", but she is alone. In a frantic attempt to rescue his daughter, Andy reveals a heavy slab covering the entrance, which leads him to wonder how Heidi got down there, and he realizes that is where the stationmaster hid the slaves, with Heidi revealing the "them" she was talking about were corpses that had been forgotten. When the stationmaster was murdered, there was no one to let the slaves out and they died in the station. Heidi tells her father that she thinks something else is in the station too. She tells her family that she wishes to leave the house. Joyce tells her that she released the spirits and that the bad things are gone, but Heidi insists that Mr. Gordy told her she let something bad out. When Andy takes his daughter's side, it causes a rift between him and Lisa. Lisa tells Heidi that the stationmaster was a good man, to which Heidi replies, "No, he wasn't".

Andy decides that the family will leave because he doesn't want Lisa filling Heidi's head with the idea that she is sick and needs to be on medication. As they are packing up to leave, the ghost of the stationmaster can be seen watching them. Joyce decides to stay and the ghosts of the slaves alert her to the stationmaster's presence. She sees him walking towards Heidi and when she attempts to warn her niece, the stationmaster turns his attention on her. Joyce coughs up a needle and begins to become sutured from the inside. Meanwhile, Lisa notices that Heidi has disappeared from the truck and she decides to check Joyce's trailer. She finds her sister strung from the ceiling and cuts the sutures just before the stationmaster is able to get them. When Lisa asks her sister where Heidi is, Joyce replies that "they know", which leads Lisa to accept her visions.

She follows the guidance of the conductor's ghost, which leads her to the station. There, she finds a hidden door and discovers many animals that had been stuffed by the stationmaster. It is revealed that the stationmaster had kept many slaves and stuffed them for his own keeping, including Nell, Levi, and the conductor. She finds Heidi tied to the stationmaster's table, and when she attempts to escape with her daughter, she finds the way blocked, except by going straight up through the ground. Heidi begins to climb and then is pulled up through the ground. When Lisa attempts to follow her, she is pulled back down by the stationmaster. She is confronted by the ghost, but experiences a vision of her mother who tells her to "let them in". She finally embraces her visions and finds out that the stationmaster had told Nell, Levi, and the conductor that he would be back for them, but traps them instead, leaving them to starve so that he could stuff them. Learning the truth, it allows their spirits to be freed and have their vengeance on the stationmaster. The stationmaster's death is revisited, but instead of it being the townspeople who murder him, it is the spirits of all those he had killed. This allows Lisa to escape and the stationmaster's spirit to be destroyed. It is then revealed that the person who had pulled Heidi through the ground was actually the spirit of Mr. Gordy, who was the stationmaster's descendant and was acting as a protector of the Wyrick family.

Two weeks later, Andy attempts to hang a tire swing for Heidi. Lisa and Joyce speculate about why Mr. Gordy hadn't wanted people on his land and come to the conclusion that he wanted his ancestor to be remembered for the good that he did and not the bad. Meanwhile, Heidi is struggling to ride her bike when it suddenly straightens up. She turns around to see Mr. Gordy and he sends her off to ride happily where she sees the spirits of Nell, Levi, and the Conductor heading off into the woods, finally free. She turns around and sees Mr. Gordy waving goodbye to her before he turns and walks away into the afterlife, satisfied that the Wyricks are safe.

In a text epilogue, it is revealed that the Wyricks remained in that house for another five years, Lisa's visions have not returned, and that Heidi never saw Mr. Gordy again. The final shot shows photos of the real-life Heidi and Mr. Gordy, and then the entire Wyrick family.

Cast
 Abigail Spencer as Lisa Wyrick
 Chad Michael Murray as Andy Wyrick
 Emily Alyn Lind as Heidi Wyrick
 Katee Sackhoff as Joyce
 Cicely Tyson as Mama Kay
 Jaren Mitchell as Levi
 Lauren Pennington as Nell 
 Grant James as Mr. Gordy

Release
The film was given a limited release in the United States on 1 February 2013 and around the world during 2013 with a wide release in the United Kingdom on 31 October 2013.

Reception

The film received mostly negative reviews, though it fared slightly better than its predecessor, with a 19% approval rating based on 16 reviews on Rotten Tomatoes; Metacritic gave the film a score of 25 out of 100, indicating "generally unfavorable reviews", based on five reviews.

References

External links
 
 
 

2013 films
2013 horror films
2010s psychological horror films
American psychological horror films
Gold Circle Films films
Films set in 1993
Films set in Georgia (U.S. state)
Films scored by Michael Wandmacher
Horror films based on actual events
2010s English-language films
2010s American films